Tim McCormack is a politician from Euclid, Ohio. He has served in a wide array of positions ranging from Commissioner, Auditor, as well as Euclid City Councilman, State Representative, and State Senator. He is currently a Judge of the Ohio Court of Appeals in the Eighth Appellate District.

External links
Court of Appeals: Tim McCormack

References

1940s births
Living people
Ohio state senators
People from Euclid, Ohio